WORC is a radio station broadcasting on 1310 AM from Worcester, Massachusetts, and is owned by Gois Broadcasting. The station broadcasts at a transmitter power output of 5,000 watts during the day and 1,000 Watts at night, and serves central and eastern Massachusetts. Since January 2005, the station has been broadcasting full-time in Spanish with a tropical music format. The station is the only full-time Spanish-language station serving central Massachusetts, especially Worcester's rapidly increasing Latino population. WORC's programming is also heard on translator station W291DB (106.1 FM).

History
A one-time affiliate of both the CBS and ABC radio networks, WORC from 1955 until 1984 had a top 40 format. In late 1984, the station began programming country music. When the station was purchased by The Davis Advertising Company of Worcester in 1989, the format became oldies, as management attempted to re-create the excitement of WORC's early rock and roll years. By August 1994, the oldies format was gradually being phased out in favor of a talk format. Davis eventually sold WORC to the present owners who instituted the current format.

Translator

External links
FCC History Cards for WORC

ORC
Radio stations established in 1925
ORC
Tropical music radio stations
1925 establishments in Massachusetts